Venus is a 1922 German-language opera by Othmar Schoeck, to a libretto by Armin Rueger after Prosper Mérimée's "La Vénus d'Ille" and Joseph Freiherr von Eichendorff's The Marble Statue. Its world premiere took place at Zurich Opera House on May 10, 1922.

References

1922 operas
Operas by Othmar Schoeck
Adaptations of works by Joseph von Eichendorff
Operas based on works by Prosper Mérimée
German-language operas